The following is a list of the 27 cantons of the Charente-Maritime department, in France, following the French canton reorganisation which came into effect in March 2015:

 Aytré
 Chaniers
 Châtelaillon-Plage
 Île d'Oléron
 Île de Ré
 La Jarrie
 Jonzac
 Lagord
 Marans
 Marennes
 Matha
 Pons
 Rochefort
 La Rochelle-1
 La Rochelle-2
 La Rochelle-3
 Royan
 Saint-Jean-d'Angély
 Saint-Porchaire
 Saintes
 Saintonge Estuaire
 Saujon
 Surgères
 Thénac
 Tonnay-Charente
 La Tremblade
 Les Trois Monts

References